Lampronia altaica is a moth of the family Prodoxidae. It is found in the Altai Mountains of central Asia, the Ryanggang Province of North Korea and in Japan.

The wingspan is 10.5-11.5 mm for males and about 9 mm for females. The forewings are brownish gray with a purplish violet lustre. There are three yellowish orange spots along the costa and two more along the rear edge. The hindwings are unicoloured brownish grey with a metallic lustre.

References

Moths described in 1992
Prodoxidae
Moths of Asia